Gay Gallanta is an American-bred, British-trained champion Thoroughbred racehorse and successful broodmare. She was awarded the title of European Champion Two-Year-Old Filly at the 1994 Cartier Racing Awards. In her championship season she won two of her five starts; the Group One Cheveley Park Stakes and the Group Three Queen Mary Stakes.

Background
Gay Gallanta is a chestnut mare, bred in Kentucky by Flaxman Holdings Ltd, the American breeding division of the Niarchos family's racing interests. She was sired by Woodman out of the Nureyev mare Gallanta.

Woodman, a son of Mr. Prospector, was a highly successful stallion, siring the winners of more than twenty Group One races including the champions Bosra Sham, Hawk Wing and Hector Protector. Gallanta produced at least twelve winners after a racing career which included a win in the Prix de Cabourg and a second place  in the Prix Morny. As daughter of Gay Missile, Gallanta was closely related to the leading American thoroughbreds Summer Squall, A.P. Indy and Lemon Drop Kid.

Gay Gallanta was sent to the Keeneland July sales as  yearling where she was bought for $350,000 by the BBA.

She was trained throughout her career by Michael Stoute at Newmarket, Suffolk.

Racing career

1994: two-years-old season
Gay Gallanta's debut was not a particularly promising one, as she finished fifth of the ten runners in a maiden race at Sandown Park Racecourse at the end of May. She was nevertheless sent to Royal Ascot for the Queen Mary Stakes, the first Group race of the season for two-year-old fillies. She started as a 16/1 outsider but belied her odds by taking the lead two furlongs and running on well to hold off the strong challenge of Myself to win by a head. The field proved to be a strong one: Myself went on to win the Nell Gwyn Stakes, while the third placed Hoh Magic won the Group One Prix Morny later that season.

Gay Gallanta's next appearance came two months later at York in the Lowther Stakes for which she was made joint-favourite with Harayir, to whom she was set to concede three pounds. She was held up in the early stages by Walter Swinburn before making a challenge in the straight. She could never reach the impressive Harayir however, and was beaten three lengths. Unusually for a leading two-year-old filly, she was then tried against colts, and finished third to Princely Hush in the Mill Reef Stakes at Newbury.

On her final start of the season, Gay Gallanta was sent to Newmarket for the Cheveley Park Stakes, one of the two Group One races for two-year-old fillies in Britain. She was largely ignored in the betting, starting at 14/1 while Harayir was made 9/4 favourite. Ridden by Pat Eddery, Gay Gallanta tracked the leaders before making a strong effort in the last quarter mile. She ran on "gamely" under pressure to take the lead in the closing stages and win by half a length from Tanami, with Harayir third.

Looking back on the two-year-old fillies of 1994, Sue Montgomery, writing in The Independent commented that they "kept beating each other, but there was much to admire about the determination of Gay Gallanta."

1995: three-year-old season
Gay Gallanta failed to win in five starts as a three-year-old. She started joint-favourite for the Fred Darling Stakes, a trial race for the 1000 Guineas, but could finish only fifth behind Aqaarid. In the Guineas itself she made little impression when finishing seventh to Harayir.

Another disappointing effort followed in the Coronation Stakes, but she showed a return to something like her best form in the Falmouth Stakes. After looking outpaced at one stage, she "rallied" strongly and just failed to catch Caramba, finishing second by a short head, with Harayir third. She had shown impressive acceleration and, before the result of the photo-finish was announced, most observers were convinced that she had won.

Two weeks later she was dropped down to Listed class for the Oak Tree Stakes but finished seventh of the ten runners behind Brief Glimpse. She was then retired to stud.

Race record

Assessment
In the 1994 Cartier Racing Awards, Gay Gallanta was named European Champion Two-Year-Old Filly.

She was rated the second best two-year-old filly in Europe by the International Classification for 1994.

Breeding record
Gay Gallanta was retired to her owners' Cheveley Park Stud at Newmarket. She has proved to be a successful broodmare, producing eight winners. Her best foal has been Byron (by Green Desert) who won the Mill Reef Stakes and the Lennox Stakes.

Pedigree

References

1992 racehorse births
Racehorses bred in Kentucky
Racehorses trained in the United Kingdom
Cartier Award winners
Thoroughbred family 3-l